Hanna Jarkiewicz (born 31 August 1954) is a Polish rower. She competed in the women's double sculls event at the 1980 Summer Olympics.

References

1954 births
Living people
Polish female rowers
Olympic rowers of Poland
Rowers at the 1980 Summer Olympics
Sportspeople from Wrocław